The Constituent Assembly of Turkey, also called the Chamber of Deputies, existed from 6 January 1961 to 24 October 1961. It was established by the military rule of 1960 Turkish coup d'état. About half of the members were appointed by the military rule and the rest were the elected members. Among the elected members there were Republican People's Party (CHP) and Republican Nation Party members as well as various NGO members. But the former Democrat Party (DP) members were not allowed in the parliament.

Main parliamentary milestones 
Some of the important events in the history of the parliament are the following:

Background:Between the 11th term and the constituent assembly
27 May 1960- Following the coup, Cemal Gürsel formed the 24th government of Turkey
12 June 1960 – The former parliament was legally abolished and a group of 36 coup members (MBK) temporarily undertook legislation.
29 September 1960- DP was closed by the military rule
15 November 1960 – 14 members  of the MGK were expelled from MGK and sent to various embassies abroad.
22 November 1960 – Law 132 : Turkish standards institute (TSE) was established
5 January 1961- Cemal Gürsel formed the 25th government of Turkey

During the Constituent Assembly 
 6 January 1961 – The parliament was opened after a pause of seven months, Kazım Orbay was elected as the speaker
 11 January 1961 – Justice Party (AP) and some other parties were founded
12 January 1961 – New Turkey Party (YTP) was founded
23 April 1961 – Parliament museum (later War of Independence Museum)  was established on the 41st anniversary of the Turkish parliament
9 July 1961 –Referendum for the new constitution (accepted)
15 October 1961 -General elections

References

 

 
1961 establishments in Turkey
1961 disestablishments in Turkey
Terms of the Grand National Assembly of Turkey
Political history of Turkey
Constituent assemblies